Bait al-Sa'adi is a sub-district located in al-Sha'ar District, Ibb Governorate, Yemen. Bait al-Sa'adi had a population of 4600 according to the 2004 census.

References 

Sub-districts in Ash Sha'ar District